Look Mom... No Hands is the first solo studio album by American hip hop musician Vast Aire, one half of the duo Cannibal Ox. It was released on Chocolate Industries on April 27, 2004. It features contributions from MF Doom, RJD2, Madlib, Aesop Rock, and Sadat X. It peaked at number 47 on the Billboard Independent Albums chart.

Critical reception

John Bush of AllMusic gave the album 3.5 stars out of 5, stating, "Vast's chillingly detached raps and delivery were a large part of Cannibal Ox's success, and there's much more in the same vein here." Nathan Rabin of The A.V. Club described it as a "riveting combination of old school B-boy attitude and post-apocalyptic menace". Christopher R. Weingarten of CMJ New Music Monthly commented that "Vast's flow, while leisurely, still utilizes the most impossibly matter-of-fact delivery in the underground, which he uses for maximum effect."

Meanwhile, David Drake of Stylus Magazine gave the album a grade of D+, saying, "this album lacks the plaintive street poetry of The Cold Vein, as well as that album's focus and consistent production aesthetic." Rollie Pemberton of Pitchfork gave the album a 6.3 out of 10, calling it "an awkward, inconsistent amalgam of wasted talent and musical apathy."

Track listing

Personnel
Credits adapted from liner notes.

 Vast Aire – vocals, production (17), photography
 Jest One – production (1), recording (1)
 Bo Boddie – mixing (1–7, 9–12, 14–17)
 S.A. Smash – vocals (2)
 DJ Cip One – turntables (2, 3, 5, 6, 10, 12, 13, 17)
 Camu Tao – production (2)
 Nasa – recording (2), production (4)
 T One – production (3, 9)
 Nonezio – recording (3–5, 8–12, 14, 16, 17)
 Karniege – vocals (4, 13), graffiti art
 Nathaniel Roberts – vocals (5, 14), recording (11)
 Jake One – production (5)
 Blueprint – vocals (6), production (6, 15), recording (6, 15)
 Metro – vocals (7)
 Cryptic One – production (7), recording (7)
 MF Doom – vocals (8), production (8), mixing (8)
 Sadat X – vocals (10)
 Sinclair – vocals (10), keyboards (14)
 Ayatollah – production (10), turntables (10)
 Madlib – production (11, 14, 16)
 RJD2 – production (12)
 Breez Evahflowin' – vocals (13)
 Poison Pen – vocals (13)
 Aesop Rock – vocals (13)
 Da Beatminerz – production (13)
 Evil D – recording (13), mixing (13)
 Mr. Walt – recording (13), mixing (13)
 Butta L – engineering assistance (13)
 Simone Harrison – vocals (14)
 Breezly Brewin – vocals (16)
 Vordul Mega – vocals (16)
 Chris Gehringer – mastering
 Brent Rollins – art direction, design
 Jon Breiner – cover illustration
 Luke Barber Smith – photography
 Sumkid – photography
 Taku – photography
 Kenshin Ichikawa – Vast Aire logo

Charts

References

External links
 

2004 debut albums
Vast Aire albums
Chocolate Industries albums
Albums produced by Ayatollah
Albums produced by Da Beatminerz
Albums produced by Jake One
Albums produced by Madlib
Albums produced by MF Doom
Albums produced by RJD2